Raphael Holinshed (before 24 April 1582) was an English chronicler, who was most famous for his work on The Chronicles of England, Scotlande, and Irelande, commonly known as Holinshed's Chronicles. It was the "first complete printed history of England composed as a continuous narrative". The Holinshed Chronicles was a major influence on many Renaissances writers, such as Shakespeare, Spenser, Daniel, and Marlowe.

Biography
Little is known about Holinshed's life and for the most part his early years are primarily a matter of speculation. Holinshed was most likely born to Ralph Holinshed of Cophurst in Sutton Downes, Cheshire. The date of his birth is unknown. Holinshed is assumed to have received an education from student records from Christ's College in Cambridge, which show a student under the name Holinshed attending the school from 1544 to 1545. In his later years, he lived in London where he worked as a translator for the printer, Reginald Wolfe. Wolfe gave him the project of compiling a world history from the Flood to the reign of Queen Elizabeth. Holinshed was only one contributor to this work; others involved in its production included George Bishop, John Hunne and Lucus Harrison.

Vernon Snow, an author who writes an introduction to Holinshed's Chronicles in the later edition, remarks that Holinshed was an experienced Cambridge-educated translator. As far as anyone knows, no other known works by Holinshed are available. A few months after the Chronicles had been licensed, Holinshed retired to the countryside near Warwick where he died around 1580. His will was proven on 24 April 1582, leaving his belongings and estate to a Mr. Burdet, whom he referred to as his master. Holinshed's Chronicles was published soon after his death.

Holinshed's Chronicles

The idea for Holinshed's Chronicles was born from Reginald Wolfe. A London printer, Wolfe was one of the original members of the Royal Stationers' Company. In 1548, Wolfe conceived the idea of creating a "Universal Cosmography of the whole world, and there with also certain particular histories of every known nation". He wanted the work to be printed in English and he wanted maps and illustrations in the book as well. Wolfe acquired many of John Leland's works and with these he constructed chronologies and drew maps that were up to date. This took over 24 years of his life; however, when Wolfe realised he could not complete this project on his own, he hired Raphael Holinshed and William Harrison to assist him.
 
Wolfe died with the work still uncompleted in 1573, and the project, changed to a work about Britain (England and Scotland) and Ireland, was run by a consortium of three members of the London stationers. They kept Raphael Holinshed, who employed William Harrison, Richard Stanyhurst, Edmund Campion and John Hooker. In 1577, the work was published in two volumes after some censorship by the Privy Council of some of Stanyhurst's contribution on Ireland.

A second edition was issued in 1587 (also included many woodcut illustrations to go along with the chronicles), but it contained some passages that were considered offensive to the Queen and her ministers. The pages in question were removed by order of the Privy Council. The missing passages were separately published in 1723, and a complete reprint appeared in 1807. Holinshed's Chronicles was an "extremely popular work when it was first published," but "by the seventeenth century it was already considered outdated and inaccurate", losing its popularity and credibility.

Renaissance writers inspired by Holinshed

Shakespeare 
William Shakespeare used the revised second edition of the Chronicles (published in 1587) as the source for most of his historical plays, such as Richard III, the plot of Macbeth, and for portions of King Lear and Cymbeline. According to Alison Taufer, "We care about the Holinshed Chronicles because Shakespeare read them". It is because of Shakespeare's writing that the public was educated on many important points in history. While dramatised, the innate messages behind the history are portrayed through the history plays.
 King Lear – Holinshed's Chronicles goes into depth about Welsh king, Llŷr from the 8th century BCE, which accurately describes the plot of King Lear; however, the king's madness is Shakespeare's own creativity. The rest of the play follows Holinshed's Chronicles closely, such as the emphasis of Cordelia's love for her father. The added dramatics, however, are what make the play an effective popular piece of culture.
 Macbeth – Holinshed's Chronicles retells the story of Duncan of Scotland and his reign; however, it is now believed that King Duncan is based on a legend rather than an actual king. Holinshed's Duncan is characterized as a weak king with a "soft and gentle nature", while Macbeth is a cruel leader. Shakespeare, in contrast, gives Lady Macbeth a larger role in his play and included her sleepwalking habits and suicidal thoughts into his characterisation.

Marlowe 
 Edward II – Like Shakespeare, Christopher Marlowe was greatly inspired by the Chronicles, particularly in Edward II. Details he borrows from the story include class issues and inheritance and details of Edward II's brutal murder at Berkeley Castle.

References

Sources

Further reading

External links

 
 
 
 The Holinshed Project at Oxford University, with parallel texts of the 1577 and 1587 editions.
 Holinshed's Chronicles, from the Horace Howard Furness collection at the University of Pennsylvania

16th-century English historians
16th-century male writers
16th-century scholars
Writers from London
1580s deaths
English chroniclers
Year of birth unknown
Place of birth unknown
1529 births
People from Cheshire
Holinshed's Chronicles